This is a complete list of fellows of the Royal Society elected in its fourth year, 1663.

Founder fellows
Robert Boyle (1627–1691)
Alexander Bruce, 2nd Earl of Kincardine (1629–1681)
John Wilkins (1614–1672)
Sir Christopher Wren (1632–1723)

Fellows 

John Alleyn (1621–1663)
James Annesley (1645–1690)
John Aubrey (1626–1697)
Sir Thomas Baines (1622–1680)
Peter Ball (1638–1675)
Ralph Bathurst (1620–1704)
John Beale (1613–1683)
George Berkeley (1628–1698)
Sir John Birkenhead (1616–1679)
Richard Boyle (d. 1665)
William Brereton (1632–1680)
Robert Bruce (1626–1685)
David Bruce (1657–1690)
Sir Edward Bysshe (1615–1679)
Archibald Campbell (1629–1685)
William Cavendish (1617–1684)
William Cavendish (1641–1707)
Walter Charlton (1620–1707)
Timothy Clarke (d. 1672)
Sir John Clayton (d. 1710)
John Clotworthy (d. 1665)
Daniel Colwall (d. 1690)
James Compton (1622–1681)
Anthony Ashley Cooper (1621–1683)
Edward Cotton (1616–1675)
Thomas Coxe (1615–1685)
Thomas Coxe (b. 1640)
John Crawford-Lindsay (1596–1678)
John Creed (d. 1701)
William Croone (1633–1684)
Sir John Denham (1615–1669)
Sir Kenelm Digby (1603–1665)
John Dryden (1631–1700)
Andrew Ellis (d. 1673)
Sir George Ent (1604–1689)
William Erskine (d. 1685)
John Evelyn (1620–1706)
Sir Francis Fane (1612–1681)
Nicasius le Febure (1610–1669)
Sir John Finch (1626–1682)
Sir Henry Ford (1617–1684)
Sir Alexander Fraizer (1610–1681)
William Gomildon (d. 1691)
Theodore Haak (1605–1690)
William Hammond ( 1635 – c.1685)
Sir Edward Harley (1624–1700)
Christopher Hatton (1605–1670)
Sir James Hayes (d. 1693)
Thomas Henshaw (1618–1700)
Nathaniel Henshaw (1628–1673)
William Hoare (d. 1666)
William Holder (1616–1698)
Robert Hooke (1635–1703)
Sir John Hoskins (1634–1705)
Charles Howard (1630–1713)
Christian Huyghens (1629–1695)
Sir Justinian Isham (1611–1675)
Richard Jones (1641–1712)
Sir Andrew King (d. 1678)
Sir Ellis Leighton (d. 1685)
Sir James Long (1617–1692)
Anthony Lowther (1641–1693)
John Lucas (1606–1671)
Christopher Merrett (1614–1695)
Edward Montagu (1625–1672)
Henry Mordaunt (1624–1697)
Sir Anthony Morgan (1621–1668)
Caspar Needham (1622–1679)
William Neile (1637–1670)
Sir Thomas Nott (1606–1681)
Henry Oldenburg (1617–1677)
Philip Packer (1618–1686)
Dudley Palmer (1617–1666)
Robert Paston (1631–1683)
John Pell (1611–1685)
Sir William Persall (b. 1601)
Peter Pett (1610–1672)
Sir Peter Pett (1630–1699)
Sir John Pettus (1613–1685)
Henry Pierrepont (1607–1680)
Walter Pope (1627–1714)
Francis Potter (1594–1678)
Thomas Povey (1615–1702)
Henry Power (1623–1668)
Sir Richard Powle (1628–1678)
Henry Powle (1630–1692)
Henry Proby (1646–1664)
William Quatremain (1618–1667)
Sir Charles Scarburgh (1615–1694)
Sir James Shaen (d. 1695)
Henry Slingsby (1621–1688)
George Smyth (1629–1702)
Samuel Sorbiere (1615–1670)
Sir Robert Southwell (1635–1702)
Thomas Sprat (1635–1713)
Alexander Stanhope (1638–1707)
Thomas Stanley (1625–1678)
Sir John Talbot (1630–1714)
Sir Gilbert Talbot (1607–1695)
Christopher Terne (1620–1673)
Sir Samuel Tuke (d. 1674)
Victor Beaufort Vabres de Fresars (1663–1674)
Cornelius Vermuyden (1627–1693)
Edmund Waller (1606–1687)
John Wallis (1616–1703)
Seth Ward (1617–1689)
Edward Waterhouse (1619–1670)
Daniel Whistler (1619–1684)
Sir Joseph Williamson (1633–1701)
Thomas Willis (1621–1675)
Francis Willughby (1635–1672)
John Winthrop (1606–1676)
Thomas Wren (1633–1679)
Matthew Wren (1629–1672)
Sir Peter Wyche (1628–1699)
Sir Cyril Wyche (1632–1707)
Edmund Wylde (1618–1695)
William Wynde (1647–1722)

References

1663
1663 in science
1663 in England